Kostas Maniatis (born 13 May 1983) is a Greek footballer who plays for AEL Kalloni in the Football League (Greece) as a goalkeeper.

External links 
 
Myplayer.gr Profile
Profile at Onsports.gr
Profile at The Football League's website

1983 births
Living people
Greek footballers
Kalamata F.C. players
Korinthos F.C. players
Panetolikos F.C. players
Kallithea F.C. players
Fokikos A.C. players
Paniliakos F.C. players
Iraklis Psachna F.C. players
Association football goalkeepers
Panelefsiniakos F.C. players
Footballers from Piraeus